Foster Boy is a 2019 American drama film directed by Youssef Delara and starring Shane Paul McGhie, Matthew Modine and Louis Gossett Jr. Shaquille O’Neal served as an executive producer of the film.

Cast
Shane Paul McGhie as Jamal Randolph
Matthew Modine as Michael Trainer
Michael Hyatt as Shaina Randolph
Michael Beach as Bill Randolph
Lex Scott Davis as Keisha James
Anand Desai-Barochia as Sanjay
Julie Benz as Pamela Dupree
Louis Gossett Jr. as Judge George Taylor
Evan Handler as Samuel Collins
Dominic Burgess as Dan Cohen
Amy Brenneman as Kim Trainer
Jordan Belfi as Jeff
Krystian Alexander Lyttle as Young Jamal
Grant Harvey as Joey Poule
Brendan Morrow as Young Joey Poule

Production
James Earl Jones was originally going to play the role played by Gossett.

Reception
Sandie Angulo Chen of Common Sense Media awarded the film three stars out of five.  Matt Fagerholm of RogerEbert.com awarded the film one and a half stars.

References

External links
 
 

American drama films
2010s English-language films
2010s American films